Museica is the sixth studio album by the Italian rapper Caparezza, released on April 22, 2014.

Music and lyrics 

According to Caparezza, Museica is "more or less rap rock. It’s not a Bob Dylan album."

Track listing 
 "Canzone all'entrata"
 "Avrai ragione tu (Ritratto)"
 "Mica Van Gogh"
 "Non me lo posso permettere"
 "Figli d'arte"
 "Comunque dada"
 "Giotto Beat" 
 "Cover"
 "China Town"
 "Canzone a metà"
 "Teste di Modì"
 "Argenti vive"
 "Compro horror"
 "Kitaro" (Michele Salvemini, Mizuki Shigeru, Taku Izumi)
 "Troppo politico"
 "Sfogati"
 "Fai da tela" (feat. Diego Perrone)
 "È tardi" (feat. Michael Franti)
 "Canzone all'uscita"

Bonus tracks
 "Museica Documentario (Short Version)"

Commercial performance

Weekly charts

Year-end charts

Certifications

References

2014 albums
Caparezza albums
Rap rock albums